The Angan or Kratke Range languages are a family of the Trans–New Guinea languages in the classification of Malcolm Ross. The Angan languages are clearly valid as a family. They were first identified as such by J. Lloyd and A. Healey in 1968; Wurm (1975) classified them as Trans–New Guinea. Glottolog treats Angan as a separate or unclassified family, ignoring further evidence.

The languages are spoken in the Kratke Range of Eastern Highlands Province and adjoining areas of Gulf Province and Morobe Province.

Languages
Ross (2005) classifies the languages as follows:
Angan
 Angaatiha
 Angan proper (Nuclear Angan)
Angan branch A: Hamtai (Kapau), Kamasa, Kawatsa, Menya, Yagwoia
Angan branch B: Akoye (Lohiki), Yipma (Baruya), Safeyoka, Simbari, Susuami, Tainae (Ivori)

Branch A is defined by the pronouns 1sg ni and 2sg ti. Ankave is not listed in Ross's classification. It has the 1sg pronouns based on ni, but not a 2sg based on ti.

Usher (2020) is both more agnostic and contradicting of Ross's 'A' and 'B' branches:

Kratke Range
Angaataha
Yagwoia
Northeast: Kamasa, Kawacha, Safeyoka, Susuami
Northwest: Baruya (Yipma), Simbari
Southeast: Hamtai (Kapau), Menya
Southwest: Akoye (Lohiki) – Tainae (Ivori), Angave

Menya is notable for its dyadic kinship terms  (terms referring to the relationship two or more people have to each other), which are rare globally and not prevalent in Papua New Guinea (though they also exist in the Oksapmin language).

Many Angan languages are covered by phonological sketches in Lloyd (1973a, b).

Pronouns
Ross (1995) reconstructs the pronouns (independent and object prefixes) as follows:
{|
! !!sg!!du!!pl
|-
!1
|*nə, *ni*nə-||*nʌ, *yʌi*e(a)-||*nʌi*na-
|-
!2
|*gə, *ti*gə-||*kʌi||*sʌi*se-
|-
!3
|*gʌ*u-/*w-||?(=3sg)||*ku(=3sg)
|}

Vocabulary comparison
The following basic vocabulary words are from the Trans-New Guinea database:

References

Lloyd, R.G. "The Angan Language Family". In Franklin, K. editor, The linguistic situation in the Gulf District and adjacent areas, Papua New Guinea. C-26:31-110. Pacific Linguistics, The Australian National University, 1973. 

 
Languages of Papua New Guinea
Morobe–Eastern Highlands languages